Lycée Jean Jaurès may refer to:
Lycée Jean Jaurès - Argenteuil (Paris area)
Lycée Jean-Jaurès - Châtenay-Malabry (Paris area)
Lycée Jean Jaurès - Montreuil, Seine-Saint-Denis (Paris area)
 - Reims